Trinidad and Tobago competed in the 2015 Parapan American Games.

Competitors
The following table lists Trinidad and Tobago's delegation per sport and gender.

Medalists
The following competitors from Trinidad and Tobago won medals at the games. In the by discipline sections below, medalists' names are bolded.

|  style="text-align:left; width:78%; vertical-align:top;"|

|  style="text-align:left; width:22%; vertical-align:top;"|

Athletics

Men

Swimming

Women

Table tennis

References

2015 in Trinidad and Tobago sport
Nations at the 2015 Parapan American Games
Trinidad and Tobago at the Pan American Games